Reasons to Live may refer to:

 Reasons to Live (album), a 2013 album by Hilly Eye
 "Reasons to Live", a 2008 song by DragonForce from Ultra Beatdown
 "Reasons to Live", a 2022 song by Pale Waves from Unwanted
 Reasons to Live, a 1985 short-story collection by Amy Hempel

See also
 A Reason to Live (disambiguation)
 "Reason to Live", a 1987 song by Kiss from Crazy Nights "Reason to Live", a 2001 song by Gotthard from the album Homerun''